Wildcat Marsh is the wetlands delta formed by the mouth of Wildcat Creek at its confluence with Castro Creek in Richmond, California. The marsh is critical habitat for endangered species and has been contaminated  and damaged by runoff from the Chevron Richmond Refinery and the city's landfill and a salvage yard. The marsh was isolated from tidal effects but restoration efforts are underway as is the closure of the landfill and cleanup of the mudflats contaminated by mercury and PAHs from the refinery.

See also
Castro Creek
Castro Cove

Notes

Geography of Richmond, California
Landforms of Contra Costa County, California
Wetlands of the San Francisco Bay Area
Marshes of California